The Léopard-class training ships are a class of sea vessels built for the Marine Nationale (French Navy) to train French officer-candidates in basic seamanship. There are eight of these vessels built. They were built by La Perrière in Lorient, Ateliers et Chantiers de la Manche (ACM) in Saint-Malo, and Société Française de Construction Navale (SFCN). These vessels have a secondary role of anti-pollution work and coastal patrol, and are still in active service as of 2022.

Origin
The Léopard-class training ships are used for navigational and practical training of French Navy officer-candidates at sea. In the 1970s, ex-minesweepers were converted into training ships and formed both the 20th and 22nd divisions. In 1978 the French Navy decided to build eight vessels to provide practical training in the operation and navigation of naval vessels. All vessels of the class were named after animals and the class is commonly referred to as "the menagerie".

Design and description
 
Ships of the class originally had twin SACM-Wärtsilä UD30 V16-M3 diesel engines, that were replaced by two  Baudouin 12M-26.2 diesel engines in 2011–2012. Power is transmitted via two shafts turning two controllable pitch propellers creating . They have two Baudouin auxiliary diesel electric alternators of 80 kW output each.

The electronic equipment includes DRBN 32 navigational radar. This replaced the DRBN 38A radar in 2011–2012. The vessels initially mounted two single Oerlikon  anti-aircraft guns but these were removed and replaced with two  machine guns in 2003. The ships of this class each have a crew composed of 1 officer, 10 sailors, and 4 quartermasters; plus 1 or 2 officers, 2 instructors, and 18 students. Each vessel has two bridges superimposed at the front of the superstructure of which one is used for training.

Ships in class

Construction and operations
The first four ships were authorised in 1980 and the remaining four in 1981. All eight ships were stationed at Brest with the first ship entering service in 1982. The class replaced the s for training purposes. All eight ships were initially assigned to the 20th division school, which was formed on 20 January 1983 in Brest, and dissolved on 13 July 1993. Since the division's dissolution, each vessel reports directly to the admiral commanding the École navale. During periods of one to three weeks at sea, students become familiar with the basic functions of chief officer on watch, running lines in navigation groups or solo, life on board, and teamwork. School ship duty is usually at the end of the school year, during June. Additionally the vessels can be used as anti-pollution and as regular patrol ships.

Notes

References

 
 
 
 
 

Patrol vessels
Gunboat classes
 
Auxiliary training ship classes
Ship classes of the French Navy